Alberto Rivera may refer to:

 Alberto Rivera (activist) (1935–1997), Spanish-American anti-Catholic activist
 Alberto Rivera (equestrian) (born 1954), Mexican Olympic equestrian
 Alberto Rivera (footballer) (born 1978), Spanish association footballer
 Albert Rivera (born 1979), Spanish politician

See also 
 Alberto Riveron (born 1960), American college football official